The McGill Martlets ice hockey team represents McGill University, based in Montreal, Quebec in U Sports women's ice hockey. They are members of the Réseau du sport étudiant du Québec (RSEQ) and have won four U Sports women's ice hockey championships. Some players have participated internationally, including in the World Student Games. Home games are played at McConnell Arena.

Origin name
The origin of name "Martlet" is used in reference to the coat of arms of McGill University, which includes three birds.  These birds were originally a part of the family crest of James McGill, founder of the university. The McGill Martlet Foundation, created in 1954, uses this heraldic symbol. The foundation is a philanthropic organization aimed at helping student athletes at  McGill. In 1976, various women's teams at McGill University adopted the use of the name "Martlets".

History 
Since 1896, women's ice hockey has existed at McGill University. In the early years of ice hockey play at McGill University, women dressed in long skirts and males were not allowed to attend.  The only exceptions were the referee and the arena employees who guarded the main entrance.  The ban was lifted a few years later.

The McGill women's ice hockey team participated in the first Women Provincial Ontario Championship in 1914.  The university league was dissolved in 1933. From 1936 to 1948, followed by the time period of 1951 to 1960, there was no competition in the Women Interuniversity Athletics Union (WIAU).

A renewal began in the 1960s. In 1963, David Kerr, a male member of the McGill Redmen, agreed to assist in the revival of the McGill women's ice hockey team. In 2006, Kerr and his wife Sheryl Drysdale (the couple met at McGill) donated $1 million for the hockey program. It is the largest donation ever made for a female sporting program in Canadian university history. The donation allowed the team's trainers to assume a full-time role with the team. In addition, the team was able to employ a scout for the Martlets in the recruitment of collegial players in Quebec.

Despite winning the 1985 Quebec Championship, the Martlets only managed to reach the qualifying rounds only once in the next 13 years. A turnaround for the Martlets began with the arrival of goalkeeper Kim St-Pierre in 1998. Her performance during four seasons helped Martlets become competitive in the Quebec Student Sports Federation, while qualifying for the playoff rounds of the Canadian Interuniversity Sport women's ice hockey championship. Martlets goaltender Kim St. Pierre also played a game for the McGill Redmen. She was the first woman in Canadian Interuniversity Sports history to win a men's regular season game when McGill University defeated Ryerson University on November 15, 2003 by a score of 5–2. Overall, the Martlets have won ten QSSF championships and three Canadian Interuniversity Sport women's ice hockey championship.

2006 and beyond 

During the 2006–07 CIS season, the Martlets were ranked as the number one university team for the duration of the entire season. At the end of season, the Martlets were crowned Quebec champions and awarded a silver medal in the Canadian championships. In the CIS final, the Martlets were defeated by a 4–0 score versus the Alberta Pandas women's ice hockey club.  Of note, 9 of their 21 players were rookies.  The following season (2007–08), the Martlets enjoyed an undefeated season, with 33 wins. In the 2008 postseason, the Martlets (with a record of 7 victories, 0 defeats), claimed the national title on March 10, 2008, in Ottawa, with a 2–0 victory against the Laurier Golden Hawks women's ice hockey program.

At the end of the 2008–09 season, the Martlets were the national women's champions for the second consecutive year.  In a rematch of the previous final, the Martlets defeat the Laurier Golden Hawks women's ice hockey team by a score of 3–1. The streak ended in the 2009–10 season, the Martlets appeared in the 2010 championship game, but were defeated by the Alberta Pandas by a 2–0 tally. Goaltender Charline Labonte and head coach Peter Smith were not with the club as they participated in the 2010 Vancouver Winter Games.

In the 2010–11 season, the Martlets won the QSSF and CIS titles. In addition, the Martlets enjoy another undefeated season with 33 victories and no losses. With their third Canadian championship in four years, the McGill Martlets hockey team become the most decorated in the history of McGill University. On October 1, 2011, the Martlets defeated the Vermont Catamounts women's ice hockey program by a 3–2 tally. With the win, coach Peter Smith earned the 300th victory of his coaching career. Twenty-eight days later (on October 29, 2011), Montreal Carabins women's ice hockey skater Ariane Barker scored with 71 seconds left to give the squad a 3–2 win at McConnell Arena. Martlets goaltender Charline Labonte took the loss for the Martlets, giving her a 69–2 overall record in her CIS career. It marked the Martlets first loss to a Quebec conference opponent for the first time in 108 games.

The Martlets and Montreal Hockey

In August 2022, the Premier Hockey Federation (PHF) unveiled the newest expansion team for the 2022-23 season, the Montreal Force. In keeping with the Martlets longstanding history with Montreal women’s hockey, several former Martlets members were signed to the new organisation including former head coach Peter Smith. He stepped into his role as head coach of the Force with four national championship victories with the Marlets under his belt. Jade Downie-Landry, Ann-Sophie Bettez, and Tricia Deguire, all former Marlets, also signed with the Force in 2022.

Awards and honours
Kim St. Pierre: Hockey Hall of Fame

RSEQ Awards
2019-20 RSEQ LEADERSHIP AWARD: Emilia Cotter, McGill

Quebec Hall of Fame
2021-2022 Charline Labonté, McGill

Most Outstanding Player
2011-12 RSEQ MOST OUTSTANDING PLAYER: Ann-Sophie Bettez
2013-2014 RSEQ MOST OUTSTANDING PLAYER: Katia Clement-Heydra, McGill
2016-17 RSEQ MOST OUTSTANDING PLAYER: Mélodie Daoust, McGill

Rookie of the Year
2011-12 RSEQ Rookie of the Year: Mélodie Daoust
2016-17 RSEQ Rookie of the Year: Tricia Deguire, McGill

RSEQ All-Stars
First Team
2011-12 RSEQ First Team All-Star: Charline Labonté
2013-14 RSEQ First Team All-Star: Katia Clement-Heydra
2016-17 RSEQ First Team All-Star: Mélodie Daoust
2016-17 RSEQ First Team All-Star: Tricia Deguire
2019-20 RSEQ First Team All-Star: Tricia Deguire
2019-20 RSEQ First Team All-Star: Jade Downie-Landry

Second Team
2016-17 RSEQ Second Team All-Star: Olivia Atkinson 
2016-17 RSEQ Second Team All-Star: Marie-Philip Lavoie 
2019-20 RSEQ Second Team All-Star: Kate Devries
2019-20 RSEQ Second Team All-Star: Léa Dumais

RSEQ All-Rookies
2016-17 RSEQ All-Rookie Team: Tricia Deguire
2016-17 RSEQ All-Rookie Team: Jade Downie-Landry

U Sports awards

Kim St. Pierre, 2000, MVP at the CIS Women's Ice Hockey Championship Tournament
Catherine Ward, 2007 CIS Rookie of the Year
Catherine Ward, 2007 CIS Tournament All-Star Team
Ann-Sophie Bettez, 2008 CIS Rookie of the Year, BLG Award (CIS Female Athlete of the Year) 2011–12
Marie-Andrée Leclerc-Auger, 2009 CIS Rookie of the Year 
Leclerc-Auger became the third member of the Martlets in three years to be named as the top rookie in CIS women’s hockey. This marked the first time in CIS history that players from the same school in a team sport were honoured as the nation’s best freshman for three consecutive years. Catherine Ward and Ann-Sophie Bettez received the award in 2006–07 and 2007–08.
Charline Labonté, 2009 BLG Award nominee (honouring the top CIS female and male athletes)
Ann-Sophie Bettez, CIS Player of the Year (Brodick Trophy) (2011–12)
Melodie Daoust, CIS Rookie of the Year (Tissot Award) (2011–12)
Katia Clement-Heydra, 2014 BLG Award nominee (honouring the top CIS female and male athletes)
Katia Clement-Heydra, CIS Player of the Year (Brodick Trophy) (2013–14)

USports Awards
Mélodie Daoust, 2013 Brodrick Trophy winner
Mélodie Daoust, 2013 RSEQ scoring champion

All-Canadians
First Team
Mélodie Daoust, 2012-13 USports First Team All-Canadian

Second Team
Jade Downie-Landry, 2019-20 U Sports Second Team All-Canadian
Katia Clement-Heydra, 2012-13 USports Second Team All-Canadian
Brittney Fouracres, 2015-16 U Sports Second Team All-Canadian

U Sports All-Rookie
Gabrielle Davidson: 2012-13 USports All-Rookie Team 
Jade Downie-Landry, 2017 USports All-Rookie Team
Tricia Deguire, 2017 USports All-Rookie Team
Goaltender – Charline Labonté, 2009 First Team
Defence – Catherine Ward, 2009 First Team 
Forward – Ann-Sophie Bettez, 2009 First Team
Defence – Cathy Chartrand, 2009 Second Team
Forward – Vanessa Davidson, 2009 Second Team
Forward – Marie-Andrée Leclerc-Auger, 2009 All-Rookie Team
Ann-Sophie Bettez, All-Canadian First Team (2011–12)
Melodie Daoust, 2015-16 U Sports First Team All-Canadian

Team awards

 Goaltender Charline Labonté and forward Ann-Sophie Bettez of Sept-Iles, Quebec, shared the honor as co-MVPs of the 2009 McGill women's hockey team
Chantal Gauvin, 2009 Most dedicated player honours
Marie-Andrée Leclerc-Auger, 2009 Martlets rookie-of-the-year honours 
Marie-Andrée Leclerc-Auger, 2009 Martlets top sniper
Rebecca Martindale, 2009 Most improved player 
Catherine Ward, 2009 Most outstanding defenceman award

Notable Martlets 
Several former McGill Martlets have gone on to become professional ice hockey players, including Ann-Sophie Bettez, Charline Labonté, Kim St-Pierre, and Catherine Ward.

Martlets in professional hockey
Four former Marlets are playing with the Premier Hockey Federation's 2022 expansion team, the Montreal Force, in its debut season: Ann-Sophie Bettez, Tricia Deguire, Jade Downey-Landry, and Laura Jardin.

International
A number of Martlets have represented Canada in international competition, including with the Canadian national ice hockey team at the Winter Olympic Games and IIHF Women's World Championship, with the Canadian national university team at the Winter Universiade, and with the Canadian national developmental (under-22) ice hockey team at the Nations Cup (previously known as the Air Canada Cup, MLP Nations Cup, and Meco Cup), among other international competitions.

Olympics
 Charline Labonté:  2006 Winter Olympics,  2010 Winter Olympics,  2014 Winter Olympics
 Kim St-Pierre:  2002 Winter Olympics,  2006 Winter Olympics,  2010 Winter Olympics
 Catherine Ward:  2010 Winter Olympics,  2014 Winter Olympics

Winter Universiade
 Alyssa Cecere:  2009 Winter Universiade
 Katia Clement-Heydra:  2013 Winter Universiade
 Brittney Fouracres:  2015 Winter Universiade

Other international
 Ann-Sophie Bettez:  2010 MLP Nations Cup
 Catherine Ward:  2009 MLP Nations Cup

See also 
 2008–09 McGill Martlets women's ice hockey season
 2009–10 McGill Martlets women's hockey season
 2010–11 McGill Martlets women's hockey season
 2011–12 McGill Martlets women's ice hockey season

References

External links

 

 
U Sports women's ice hockey teams
Women's ice hockey teams in Canada
Ice hockey teams in Montreal